Wang Shi (born 1951 in Guangxi, China) is a Chinese businessman. He is the founder and chairman of China Vanke, the largest real estate enterprise in China and the largest residential real estate developer in the world.

Career
In 1980s he was a liaison in the Foreign Trade and Economic Relations Committee of Guangdong. He quit his job in 1983 and moved to Shenzhen. In 1988 he started to shift his business towards real estate, starting 'China Vanke'. It was listed on the Shenzhen Stock Exchange in 1991 as the second listed company in all of China.

Currently, Wang Shi serves as the Executive Director of the One Foundation, and an Independent Director for the World Wildlife Fund, Sohu.com, Inc., China Resources Land, Modern Media Holding, and Central China Real Estate. In 2011, Wang Shi was named by Fortune Magazine as one of "Fifteen Business Leaders Who've Changed China."

Personal life 
The first fortune for Wang Shi was said from trading train goods and trading with Hong Kong.

From 2011 to 2013, Wang Shi studied at Harvard as a visiting scholar. He argued that his experience will help Vanke connect with the world and inspire more people to continue challenging their horizons.

Wangshi has no family members working in his organisation, and believes that position is achieved by merit and not blood.

Expeditions
Wang Shi loves mountaineering, gliding, and seafaring. In 2001, he was awarded an honor from National Sports Authority, and in 2002 he was elected the vice-chairman of Chinese Hiking Association. He has made successful attempts on reaching the highest summits of seven continents from 2002 to 2004.

In May 2003, Wang Shi and a Chinese amateur team made a successful attempt on reaching the summit of Mount Everest.  At the age of 53, he broke the Chinese record as the oldest Chinese national who has reached the summit of Mount Everest.

In April and September 2005, he successfully trekked to the North Pole and the South Pole, achieving his goal of "climbing the highest summits of seven continents and reaching the North and South Poles."

In May 2010, Wang Shi, at age 60, made another successful attempt on reaching the summit of Mount Everest alongside his friend alongside Wang Jian, and broke the Chinese age record he created back in 2003.

References

1951 births
Chinese billionaires
Living people
Vanke people
Businesspeople from Guangxi
People from Liuzhou
Chinese summiters of Mount Everest
China Resources people
Chinese real estate businesspeople
Chinese company founders
Asia Game Changer Award winners